HMS Russell was one of a dozen s (also known as the Type 14) of second-rate anti-submarine frigates built for the British Royal Navy during the 1950s. She was named for Edward Russell, 1st Earl of Orford, commander at the Battle of Barfleur in 1692.

Service
On commissioning in 1957 Russell joined the Second Training Squadron, based at Portland. In January 1958 she joined the Fishery Protection Squadron where she served until April 1963, seeing service in the Cod Wars. On 4 September 1960, an Icelandic patrol vessel, attempted to take a British fishing trawler off the Westfjords. The attempt was thwarted when Russell intervened, and the two vessels collided.

On 12 November 1960, Þór encountered the trawler Hackness which was fishing in international waters. Hackness did not stop until Þór had fired two blanks and one live shell off its bow. Once again, Russell came to assist the trawler and its shipmaster ordered the Icelandic captain to leave the trawler alone as it was not within the  limit recognised by the British government. Þórs captain, Eiríkur Kristófersson, said that he would not do so, and ordered his men to approach the trawler with the gun manned. In response, Russell threatened to sink the Icelandic boat if it opened fire upon Hackness. More British ships then arrived and Hackness retreated.

Following a refit at Rosyth she joined the 20th Frigate Squadron based at Londonderry Port. She was also used for anti-submarine training.  In 1966 she was present at Portsmouth Navy Days.

References

Publications
 
 
 
 

 

Blackwood-class frigates
1954 ships
Ships built by Swan Hunter
Ships built on the River Tyne
Ships of the Fishery Protection Squadron of the United Kingdom